Tiger & Crane Fists (AKA Savage Killers) is a 1976 kung fu movie, starring 70s Hong Kong star Jimmy Wang Yu.

The story concerns the Tiger and the Crane martial arts style of two schools that has been separated from each other for many years. No one can determine which technique is the best. Both organizations find they must put their differences aside and work together in order to defeat Lu Ting Chu, who is a nearly invincible lackey for Japanese occupational forces. Defeating Chu is essential to repelling the Japanese invaders.

Footage from the film was later used in the comedy movie Kung Pow! Enter the Fist.

Cast

Notes

External links
 

1976 films
Hong Kong action films
Kung fu films
Films directed by Jimmy Wang
1970s Hong Kong films